Calcutta North East Lok Sabha constituency was one of the 543 parliamentary constituencies in India. The constituency centred on North East area of Kolkata in West Bengal. As a consequence of the order of the Delimitation Commission in respect of the delimitation of constituencies in the West Bengal, this parliamentary constituency ceased to exist from 2009.

Assembly segments
Calcutta North East Lok Sabha constituency was composed of the following assembly segments:
  Entally (assembly constituency no. 153)
  Beliaghata (assembly constituency no. 155)
  Sealdah (assembly constituency no. 156)
  Vidyasagar (assembly constituency no. 157)
  Burtola (assembly constituency no. 158)
  Maniktola (assembly constituency no. 159)
  Belgachia West (assembly constituency no. 160)

Members of Parliament

Election results

General election 2004

General election 1999

General election 1998

General election 1996

General election 1991

General election 1989

General election 1984

General election 1980

General election 1977

General election 1971

General election 1967

General election 1962

General election 1957

General election 1952

General elections 1977-2004
Most of the contests were multi-cornered. However, only winners and runners-up are mentioned below: 

In 1957 and 1962 the constituency was Calcutta Central

See also
Kolkata
List of Constituencies of the Lok Sabha

References

Former Lok Sabha constituencies of West Bengal
Former constituencies of the Lok Sabha
Politics of Kolkata district
2008 disestablishments in India
Constituencies disestablished in 2008